Elmer Lynn Hauldren (April 1, 1922 – April 26, 2011) was an advertising copywriter based in Chicago who was best known for originating the Empire Man.

Early life and career
Hauldren was born in Missouri, one of four children born to Elmer Lynn and Frances Mary Camilla (née Ryan) Hauldren. During World War II, he served as a radio operator in Asia along the Burma Road from India to China. While delivering supplies along the road, Hauldren's unit came under fire. When Hauldren visited the area in 2005, he was greeted as a hero by locals.

Following the war, Hauldren was a copywriter at Young & Rubicam, Bozell Jacobs and DDB Needham. He later founded his own firm, Lynn Hauldren Creative. During the course of his career in advertising, he won 2 Clio awards. Lynn Hauldren was married to Helen Helmke Hauldren and they had six children, 15 grandchildren, and 10 great-grandchildren. Three of his grandchildren are the tenor Matthew Polenzani, the singer-songwriter Rose Polenzani, and Robert Hauldren of Louis the Child (DJs).

In 1977, Hauldren was working on the Empire Carpet account and could not find an actor the company approved of for the role of The Empire Man in a commercial scheduled to be shot. Instead, then company owner Seymour Cohen asked Hauldren to play the role of The Empire Man himself. The Empire Man character appeared in most commercials for the company from 1977 to 2011. The company also issued a limited edition bobble-head doll of the character. By the 2000s, Empire switched from live-action commercials to CGI, with Hauldren continuing to provide voice-overs.

Hauldren also wrote the tune used to accompany the singing of the company's phone number, and recorded the jingle with an acappella group, The Fabulous 40s. The famous Empire Today advertising jingle (eight hundred, five-eight-eight, two, three-hundred Empire!) has made the Empire Today phone number one of the most recognized numbers in the country.

Hauldren recorded several albums with the barbershop quartet Chordiac Arrest including Live and Well and Second Opinion. The group also released a live performance video entitled Chordiac Arrest! The Video. In 2007 Hauldren formed a new vocal quartet called Chordplay that has appeared on television. In 2005, Hauldren appeared in a comedic short video for the stage show, Big Time Tonight, written by comedian Landon Kirksey and directed by Jeremy Dionisio. The video features Kirksey's character entering a bar and receiving sage-like advice from Hauldren himself. He was known to say of himself "I don't own the company, I can't install carpet, and I'm not an actor." When asked for autographs, he'd reply "I'm not an actor or a celebrity. I'm a pitchman; a glorified salesman."

Death
Hauldren died on April 26, 2011, in Evanston, Illinois, at the age of 89, twenty five days after his eighty ninth birthday.

References

External links
 Empire Today
 Empire Carpet Man

1922 births
2011 deaths
American male composers
American composers
United States Army personnel of World War II
American copywriters
People from Evanston, Illinois
Place of birth missing
United States Army soldiers